Sehk (also Romanized as Sahk; also known as Sek, Sekh, and Sīk) is a village in Fakhrud Rural District, Qohestan District, Darmian County, South Khorasan Province, Iran. At the 2006 census, its population was 122, in 36 families.

References 

Populated places in Darmian County